Communization (or communisation in British English) refers to an insurrectionary period of immediate confrontation with capitalism and the direct expropriation of property, conceived as the "conscious creation of communism in our lives". Proponents of communization reject transitioning to communism through the creation of cooperatives within a capitalist economy, or waiting for a revolution that would upend capitalism some time in the future. 

Initially developed by anarcho-communists and taken up by insurrectionary anarchists, the theory of communization was defined in the late-20th century by French communists such as Gilles Dauvé and the Tiqqun collective.

History

Origins and precedents 
In his 1843 Code de la Communauté, the Neo-Babouvist Théodore Dézamy called for an immediate move from capitalism to communism. Instead of a transitional stage between the two, he envisioned the gradual abolition of the state and the "communisation of social relations" through the direct cessation of commerce. 

In The Conquest of Bread, anarcho-communist Peter Kropotkin called for the immediate expropriation of all property, for the purposes of ensuring well-being for all, following an insurrectionary period. He also proposed the immediate communisation of social relations, which would integrate both agricultural and industrial workers into the process by each fulfilling the needs of the other. But anarcho-communists came to disagree on what form communisation would take. Some came to see that it was insurrectionists themselves, rather than the organised working class, that would be the real agent of a social revolution. Critising the labour movement as reformist, this anti-organisational tendecy came to favour agitating the unemployed, expropriating food and carrying out propaganda of the deed.

Although the English socialist William Morris was critical of this individualist anarchist tendency, regarding both its theory and practice as "reactionary", in his 1893 Manifesto of English Socialists, Morris also called on socialists to dedicate themselves to immediately bringing about the "complete communization of industry for which the economic forms are ready and the minds of the people are almost prepared."

Modern conception 
In the wake of the protests of 1968, the French communist Gilles Dauvé coined the modern concept of communization, building on the earlier works of Karl Marx and Peter Kropotkin which had identified elements of communism that already existed within society. Dauvé rejected the conception of communism as a political platform that would be implemented after seizing power, as previous movements that had done so did not actually implement communism after their revolutions. Instead Dauvé called for a "communization" that would "break all separations": circulating goods without money; occupying workplaces and bringing them under social ownership; closing any workplaces that couldn't function without causing alienation; abolishing specialized education; and breaking up single-family households.

After a wave of unemployment protests in France during the late 1990s, the Tiqqun collective was established, drawing their ideology from a mix of insurrectionary anarchism, post-structuralism and post-Marxism, while drawing its stylistic influences from the French avant-garde. The collective came to characterise their anti-authoritarian form of communism by the term "communization", referring to an insurrectionary period that would lead to structural changes in society. Tiqqun rejected seizing state power, which they considered would make those that took power into a new ruling class, but instead as called for a "revolution rooted in the transformation of every day life."

See also 
 Left Communism
 Ultra-leftism
 Gilles Dauvé
 Communism
 Communist bandit
 Communist society
 Marxism
 Amadeo Bordiga
 Situationist International
 Guy Debord

References

Bibliography

Further reading 

 
 
 
   
  
 

Communism
Political theories
Anarchist theory
Marxism
Left communism
Libertarian socialism